Windham Township is the name of two separate towns in the U.S. state of Pennsylvania:
Windham Township, Bradford County, Pennsylvania
Windham Township, Wyoming County, Pennsylvania

Pennsylvania township disambiguation pages